The Yonsei Medical Journal is a general medical journal which has been published since 1960 by the Yonsei University, College of Medicine. It is published bimonthly. The journal covers in all areas related to medicine based on clinical or basic research. The editor in chief is In-Hong Choi.

Internet and open access
Since YMJ became the first Korean journal indexed in Index Medicus in 1962, YMJ has been indexed/tracked/covered by MEDLINE, PubMed, PubMed Central, Science Citation Index (SCI), BIOSIS Previews, SCOPUS, Embase, Chemical Abstracts Service (CAS), KoreaMed, Synapse, KoMCI, CrossRef and Google Scholar. Full text PDF files are available at YMJ Archive.

References

External links

WeCare Medical

General medical journals
English-language journals
Publications established in 1960